A by-election for the United Kingdom House of Commons was held in the constituency of Harrow East on 19 March 1959, following the resignation of sitting Conservative Member of Parliament (MP) Ian Harvey.

Background
In November 1958, Harvey and a Guardsman from the Coldstream Guards were found in the bushes in St James's Park and arrested; Harvey tried to escape, and attempted to give a false name on arrest. Both were charged with gross indecency and breach of the park regulations; when tried on 10 December, the indecency charge was dropped and both were fined £5. Harvey subsequently resigned his ministerial post and his seat, forcing the by-election; he paid the guardsman's fine as well as his own.

Candidates
The by-election saw the seat held by the Conservative candidate, Anthony Courtney, with a small swing to Labour, whose candidate, the future Home Secretary Merlyn Rees, had contested the seat in 1955, and would do so again in the General Election later in 1959. A minor candidate also stood, representing the National Union of Small Shopkeepers, but he lost his deposit.

Result

Previous result

See also
Harrow East constituency
Lists of United Kingdom by-elections
List of United Kingdom by-elections (1950–1979)

References

Harrow East by-election
Harrow East,1959
Harrow East by-election
Harrow East by-election
20th century in Middlesex
Harrow East,1959